Count Petar Pejačević of Virovitica (Croatian: grof Petar Pejačević Virovitički, Hungarian: verőczei gróf Péter Pejacsevich; 20 February 1804 – 15 April 1887) was a Croatian politician, who served as Hungarian Minister without portfolio of Croatian Affairs between 1871 and 1876. He was a member of the Ruma-Retfala branch of the Pejačević noble family.

Pejačević studied law in the Theresianum in Vienna. In 1845 he was appointed prefect (župan) of Bjelovar-Križevci County. During the Hungarian Revolution of 1848 he didn't support the Croatians' independence war and didn't take part in the Sabor's work, which stood by Josip Jelačić.

When Koloman Bedeković became Ban of Croatia, Pejačević was appointed Minister of Croatian Affairs. After that he retired from the politics. His relatives from the Našice branch of the family, count Ladislav Pejačević between 1880 and 1883, and Teodor Pejačević between 1903 and 1907, served as Bans (viceroys) of Croatia. Teodor was also Minister of Croatian Affairs later.

References
 Magyar Életrajzi Lexikon

Petar
Croatian politicians
19th-century Croatian people
1804 births
1887 deaths
Ministers of Croatian Affairs of Hungary
Counts of Croatia
Politicians from Bratislava
Knights of the Golden Fleece of Austria